James Squair (28 September 1881 – ????) was an English footballer, who played as forward.

Career 
Squair played for Newcastle United on 1904. From 1905 and 1907, he played for Juventus. He made his debut for the club on 12 March 1905, in a 1–1 away draw. His last match for the Juventus came on 13 January 1907 in a 2–1 away loss. He made nine appearances and scored one goal for Juventus. In 1908, he played for Torino. Due the restriction of non-Italian footballers decided by FIF, Squair did not play any official matches.

Honours

Juventus 

 Prima Categoria: 1905

References 

1881 births
Newcastle United F.C. players
Juventus F.C. players
Torino F.C. players
Year of death unknown
English footballers
English expatriate footballers
Expatriate footballers in Italy
Association football forwards